The Fort Mill Ridge Wildlife Management Area is located on  two miles (3 km) southwest of Romney in Hampshire County, West Virginia. Fort Mill Ridge WMA is owned by the West Virginia Division of Natural Resources. The Fort Mill Ridge Civil War Trenches are located at the top of the Fort Mill Ridge access road.

Fort Mill Ridge WMA is located atop Mill Creek Mountain's Fort Mill Ridge and is bound to its west by Mill Creek and its tributary Core Run and bound to its east by the South Branch Potomac River. The South Branch Valley Railroad runs along the WMA's eastern side, parallel to the South Branch. Its forests consist primarily of various oaks and Virginia pines. The primary game species are deer and squirrel. Fishing for warmwater species is available on the South Branch via an access road on the eastern side of the WMA. Camping is not permitted.

See also
Animal conservation
Fishing
Hunting
List of West Virginia wildlife management areas

References

External links
West Virginia DNR District 2 Wildlife Management Areas

Wildlife management areas of West Virginia
Protected areas of Hampshire County, West Virginia
IUCN Category V